Hau Wong or Hou Wang is a title that can be translated as "Prince Marquis" or "Holy Marquis". It is not any one person's name. Despite his failing health, he remained in the army to protect the last emperor of Southern Song Dynasty when he took refuge southwards in Kowloon.

Temples in Hong Kong
There are several temples dedicated to Hau Wong in Hong Kong, including six temples in Yuen Long. These temples can be named Hau Wong Temple or Yeung Hau Temple. The table provides a partial list of these temples.

Note 1: A territory-wide grade reassessment of historic buildings is ongoing. The grades listed in the table are based on this update (10 September 2013)  unless otherwise stated. The temples with a "Not listed" status in the table below are not graded and do not appear in the list of historic buildings considered for grading.
Note 2: While most probably incomplete, this list is tentatively exhaustive.

Islands District

Sha Tin District

Tuen Mun District

Wong Tai Sin District

Yuen Long District

Temples outside of Hong Kong

See also
 Hou Wang Temple, Queensland,  Australia
 Sung Wong Toi
 Places of worship in Hong Kong

References

Taoist temples in Hong Kong